Erica Fowler (born 8 July 1992) is an Australian rules footballer playing for the Collingwood Football Club in the AFL Women's (AFLW). Originally a rugby sevens player, Fowler joined Collingwood's VFL Women's team and became a senior player after she was selected with the club's ninth selection and the 70th pick overall in the 2018 AFLW draft.

Early life 
Fowler originally played rugby sevens, representing the University of Queensland nationally. She also played 33 games for Yeronga in the Queensland Women's Australian Football League (QWAFL) and its lower division, the Queensland Women's Football Association. Fowler suffered injury and illness in 2016, causing her to miss the Australian University Games and leaving her with a choice between her sporting and paramedicine careers. She was part of the Yeronga team victorious over Coorparoo in the 2017 QWAFL grand final. Fowler accepted an offer to join Collingwood's VFL Women's side in 2018 and split her time between sport and work, travelling from Brisbane to Melbourne every few weeks to play.

AFLW career 
For the 2018 AFLW draft, Collingwood was granted two chances to pre-select recruits to compensate for losing players to injury and rival clubs, using a similar bidding mechanism to the father–daughter rule. The club selected Fowler with pick 70; she was expected to play as a key forward and ruckwoman assisting Eliza Hynes, because of her 180-centimetre stature. She hoped her rugby sevens experience would bring "a different physicality and athleticism to the game".

Statistics
Statistics are correct the end of the S7 (2022) season.

|- 
! scope="row" style="text-align:center" | 2019
|style="text-align:center;"|
| 15 || 2 || 0 || 0 || 6 || 3 || 9 || 3 || 14 || 23 || 0.0 || 0.0 || 3.0 || 1.5 || 4.5 || 1.5 || 7.0 || 11.5
|- 
! scope="row" style="text-align:center" | 2020
|style="text-align:center;"|
| 15 || 7 || 0 || 2 || 26 || 18 || 44 || 16 || 19 || 9 || 0.0 || 0.3 || 3.7 || 2.6 || 6.3 || 2.3 || 2.7 || 1.3
|- 
! scope="row" style="text-align:center" | 2021
|style="text-align:center;"|
| 15 || 10 || 0 || 1 || 37 || 20 || 57 || 12 || 25 || 17 || 0.0 || 0.1 || 3.7 || 2.0 || 5.7 || 1.2 || 2.5 || 1.7
|- 
! scope="row" style="text-align:center" | 2022
|style="text-align:center;"|
| 15 || 9 || 0 || 1 || 29 || 15 || 44 || 9 || 11 || 15 || 0.0 || 0.1 || 3.2 || 1.7 || 4.9 || 1.0 || 1.2 || 1.7
|- 
! scope="row" style="text-align:center" | S7 (2022)
|style="text-align:center;"|
| 15 || 2 || 0 || 0 || 5 || 4 || 9 || 4 || 1 || 4 || 0.0 || 0.0 || 2.5 || 2.0 || 4.5 || 2.0 || 1.0 || 2.0
|- class="sortbottom"
! colspan=3| Career
! 30
! 0
! 4
! 103
! 60
! 163
! 44
! 70
! 68
! 0.0
! 0.1
! 3.4
! 2.0
! 5.4
! 1.5
! 2.3
! 2.3
|}

References

External links 

1992 births
Living people
Collingwood Football Club (AFLW) players
Australian rules footballers from Queensland
University of Queensland alumni
Sportswomen from Queensland